The All-Ireland Senior Hurling Championship 1901 was the 15th series of the All-Ireland Senior Hurling Championship, Ireland's premier hurling knock-out competition.  London won the championship, beating Cork 1–5 to 0–4 in the final.

Rule change

For the first time ever a hurling championship took place in all of the four historic provinces of Ireland - Connacht, Leinster, Munster and Ulster.  For the purposes of the all GAA competitions, Britain was designated as a fifth Irish province.  As a consequence, the winners of the championship in Britain would meet the winners of the championship in Ireland to decide the All-Ireland title holders.

Format

All-Ireland Championship

Semi-final: (2 matches) The four provincial representatives make up the semi-final pairings.  Two teams are eliminated at this stage while the two winning teams advance to the home final.

Home final: (1 match) The winners of the two semi-finals contest this game.  One team is eliminated while the winning team advances to the final.

Final: (1 match) The winners of the home final and London, who receive a bye to this stage of the championship, contest this game.  The winners are declared All-Ireland champions.

Results

Connacht Senior Hurling Championship

Leinster Senior Hurling Championship

Munster Senior Hurling Championship

Ulster Senior Hurling Championship

All-Ireland Senior Hurling Championship

Championship statistics

Miscellaneous

 The Ulster Championship was contested for the first time.
 The All-Ireland title went overseas for the first time when London defeated Cork in the decider. In doing so London became the sixth team to win the All-Ireland. The London team was made up of all Munster men: nine from Cork, four from Limerick, two from Clare and one each from Kerry and Tipperary.

References

Sources

 Corry, Eoghan, The GAA Book of Lists (Hodder Headline Ireland, 2005).
 Donegan, Des, The Complete Handbook of Gaelic Games (DBA Publications Limited, 2005).
 Fullam, Brendan, Captains of the Ash (Wolfhound Press, 2002).

1901
All-Ireland Senior Hurling Championship
1901 in sports
1901 in Irish sport